The 2004 Western Michigan Broncos football team represented Western Michigan University in the 2004 NCAA Division I-A football season.  They competed as members of the Mid-American Conference in the West Division. The team was coached by Gary Darnell, who was fired after the end of the season, and played their home games at Waldo Stadium in Kalamazoo, Michigan.

Schedule

References

Western Michigan
Western Michigan Broncos football seasons
Western Michigan Broncos football